Lloyd Warren Mohns (July 31, 1921 – January 24, 2005) was a Canadian  professional ice hockey defenceman who played in one National Hockey League game for the New York Rangers during the 1943–44 NHL season.

See also
List of players who played only one game in the NHL

External links

1921 births
2005 deaths
Canadian ice hockey defencemen
Hershey Bears players
Ice hockey people from Ontario
New York Rangers players
People from Renfrew County
New York Rovers players
Oakland Oaks (PCHL) players
Canadian expatriate ice hockey players in the United States